This article is about the particular significance of the year 1827 to Wales and its people.

Incumbents
Lord Lieutenant of Anglesey – Henry Paget, 1st Marquess of Anglesey 
Lord Lieutenant of Brecknockshire – Henry Somerset, 6th Duke of Beaufort
Lord Lieutenant of Caernarvonshire – Thomas Assheton Smith
Lord Lieutenant of Cardiganshire – William Edward Powell
Lord Lieutenant of Carmarthenshire – George Rice, 3rd Baron Dynevor 
Lord Lieutenant of Denbighshire – Sir Watkin Williams-Wynn, 5th Baronet    
Lord Lieutenant of Flintshire – Robert Grosvenor, 1st Marquess of Westminster 
Lord Lieutenant of Glamorgan – John Crichton-Stuart, 2nd Marquess of Bute 
Lord Lieutenant of Merionethshire – Sir Watkin Williams-Wynn, 5th Baronet
Lord Lieutenant of Montgomeryshire – Edward Clive, 1st Earl of Powis
Lord Lieutenant of Pembrokeshire – Sir John Owen, 1st Baronet
Lord Lieutenant of Radnorshire – George Rodney, 3rd Baron Rodney

Bishop of Bangor – Henry Majendie 
Bishop of Llandaff – Charles Sumner (until 12 December); Edward Copleston 
Bishop of St Asaph – John Luxmoore 
Bishop of St Davids – John Jenkinson

Events
1 March – Official opening of St David's College, Lampeter. Llewelyn Lewellin becomes its first principal, with Alfred Ollivant as vice-principal.
25 April – Sir Stapleton Cotton is created Viscount Combermere.
6 November – The Welsh-language journal, Baner y Groes, is launched for the first time; it would be revived in 1854.
date unknown
The nephew of the last Viscount Bulkeley obtains permission, by royal licence, to take the name Sir Richard Bulkeley Williams-Bulkeley.
Construction work begins on Marble Arch, designed by Welsh architect John Nash and erected in front of Buckingham Palace in London.
A source of manganese is discovered at Y Rhiw.

Arts and literature

New books
Robert Davies (Bardd Nantglyn) – Diliau Barddas
John Jones – An Explanation of the Greek Article

Music
Peroriaeth Hyfryd (collection of hymns including Caersalem by Robert Edwards)

Births
6 June – Hugh Robert Hughes, genealogist (d. 1911)
17 September - Joseph David Jones, composer (d. 1870)
27 October – Joseph Tudor Hughes (Blegwryd), harp prodigy (d. 1841)
18 November – Emmeline Lewis Lloyd, Alpinist (d. 1913)
date unknown - Griffith Arthur Jones, clergyman (d. 1906)

Deaths
10 January – John Jones, Unitarian minister and writer, about 60
25 January – John Evans, Baptist minister and writer, 59
12 May – David Richards (Dafydd Ionawr), poet, 76
27 May – Maria Bailey, wife of Sir Joseph Bailey
3 July – David Davis (Castellhywel), minister and poet, 82
22 July – William Aubrey, engineer, supervisor of Cyfarthfa ironworks, 68
11 August – Anthony Bushby Bacon, industrialist, about 55
date unknown - Helen Maria Williams, novelist and poet (in Paris)

References

 
Wales
 Wales